Do You Like Brahms? is a South Korean television series starring Kim Min-jae, Park Eun-bin, Kim Sung-cheol, Park Ji-hyun, Lee You-jin, and Bae Da-bin. It is a romance drama about the students of classical music at a prestigious institution. It aired on SBS from August 31 to October 20, 2020, every Monday and Tuesday at 22:00 (KST) time slot.

Synopsis
A drama about the dreams and love of classical music students who find their own happiness while learning music.

Cast

Main
 Kim Min-jae as Park Joon-young
 Park Sang-hoon as young Park Joon-young
 Park Eun-bin as Chae Song-ah
 Kim Sung-cheol as Han Hyun-ho
 Park Ji-hyun as Lee Jung-kyung
 Shin Soo-yeon as young Lee Jung-kyung
 Lee You-jin as Yoon Dong-yoon
 Bae Da-bin as Kang Min-sung

Supporting

Kyunghoo Cultural Foundation 
 Ye Soo-jung as Na Moon-sook
 Kim Jong-tae as Lee Sung-geun
Seo Jeong-yeon as Cha Young-in
 Choi Dae-hoon as Park Sung-jae
 Ahn Sang-eun as Jung Da-woon
 Lee Ji-won as Kim Hae-na
 Yang Jo-ah as Im Yoo-jin

Seoryeong University 
Gil Hae-yeon as Song Jeong-hee
 Baek Ji-won as Lee Soo-kyeong
 Joo Seok-tae as Yoo Tae-jin

People around Chae Song-ah 

 Kim Hak-sun as Song-ah's father
 Kim Sun-hwa as Song-ah's mother
 Lee Noh-ah as Chae Song-hee, Song-ah's elder sister

Others 
 Kim Jung-young as Park Joon-young's mother
 Ko So-hyun as Yang Ji-won, violinist
 Kim Gook-hee as Ji-won's mother
 Yoon Chan-young as Seung Ji-min, pianist
 Kim Mi-kyung as maestro

Production
Director Jo Young-min and screenwriter Ryu Bo-ri previously collaborated on the 2019 SBS drama, .

The first script reading took place in April 2020 at the SBS Tanhyeon Production Center. The drama wrapped its filming on October 15, 2020.

The main cast (Kim Min-jae, Park Eun-bin, Park Ji-hyun and Kim Sung-cheol) appeared on the 518th episode of the variety show Running Man to promote the series while Park Eun-bin appeared on 206th episode of My Little Old Boy as a special host to promote the series.

Original soundtrack

Part 1

Part 2

Part 3

Part 4

Part 5

Part 6

Part 7

Part 8

Part 9

Part 10

Part 11

Chart performance

Viewership

Awards and nominations

Notes

References

External links
  
 
 

Classical music television series
Seoul Broadcasting System television dramas
Korean-language television shows
South Korean romance television series
2020 South Korean television series debuts
2020 South Korean television series endings
South Korean musical television series
Works about pianos and pianists
Works about violins and violinists
Television series by Studio S